Colonel Robert Irwin (1738-1800) of Steele Creek Township, Mecklenburg County, North Carolina was a long term North Carolina State Senator. The first state senator ever elected from Mecklenburg County, he served as the North Carolina senator from Mecklenburg County in the years 1778-1783, and again, in the years 1787 and 1795, and, finally, from 1797 to 1800, dying in office.

Prior to entering the senate, Irwin commanded the Mecklenburg County Regiment of the Salisbury District, North Carolina militia, rising to the rank of a colonel and commandant of the 1st Mecklenburg County Regiment (Est. 1775, split into 1st & 2nd regiments 1780, and disestablished in 1783). He commanded the regiment while fighting strategically against Loyalists militia forces beside South Carolina patriot militia General Thomas Sumter at the Battle of Rocky Mount.  Later, the two again fought to victory together against loyalist provisional units and militia (while heavily outnumbered) at the Battle of Hanging Rock. Irwin is reported to have been a signer of the Mecklenburg Declaration of Independence. Colonel Irwin was of the Presbyterian faith.

Revolutionary War service
Robert Irwin held several positions in the North Carolina militia during the American Revolutionary War:
Captain in the Mecklenburg County Regiment of the North Carolina militia (1775, 1776-1777)
Captain in the 2nd Salisbury District Minutemen (1775-1776)
Lt. colonel in the Mecklenburg County Regiment of the North Carolina militia (1777-1778)
Colonel in the Mecklenburg County Regiment of the North Carolina militia (1778-1783)

Notes:

See also
Battle of Hanging Rock Historic Site

External links
 Patriot leaders
American Revolutionary War battles and skirmishes in Carolina

References

North Carolina militiamen in the American Revolution
North Carolina state senators
1738 births
1800 deaths
People from Mecklenburg County, North Carolina
Members of the North Carolina Provincial Congresses
18th-century American politicians